The  Sri Lanka grey hornbill (Ocyceros gingalensis) is a bird in the hornbill family and a widespread and common endemic resident breeder in Sri Lanka. Hornbills are a family of tropical near-passerine birds found in the Old World.

Habitat 
The Sri Lanka grey hornbill is a gregarious bird found in forest habitats.

Description 
It has grey wings with black primary flight feathers, a grey back, and a brown crown. Its long tail is blackish with white sides, and the underparts are white. The long, curved bill has no casque. Sexes are similar, although the male has a cream-coloured bill, whereas the female's is black with a cream stripe. Immature birds have dark grey upperparts, a cream bill, and a tail with a white tip. Its flight is slow and powerful.

Behaviour 
The female lays up to four white eggs in a tree hole blocked off during incubation with a cement made of mud, droppings and fruit pulp. There is only one narrow aperture, barely wide enough for the male to transfer food to the mother and chicks.
These birds usually live in pairs or small flocks consisting up to five birds (2 adults and 2-3 juveniles).

Diet 
They are omnivores observed consuming berries, fruits, insects and small lizards. It feeds mostly on figs, although occasionally it eats small rodents, reptiles and insects.

References

 Birds of India by Grimmett, Inskipp and Inskipp,

External links
 Internet Bird Collection

Sri Lanka grey hornbill
Endemic birds of Sri Lanka
Sri Lanka grey hornbill